The 1964 British West Indies Championships was the fifth edition of the track and field competition between British colony nations in the Caribbean. This marked the relaunching of the competition after a three-year break, during which the West Indies Federation had been dissolved. It was held in Kingston, Jamaica. A total of 25 events were contested, fifteen by men and ten by women. The 400 metres was added to the women's programme. The number of men's events was reduced, with the 10,000 metres, half marathon, pole vault and relay races all being dropped.

Bahamian 100 metres runner Tom Robinson was the only athlete to defend his title from the 1960 championships, although multiple former champion George Kerr topped the podium in a different middle-distance event. John Mowatt completed a double in the 5000 metres and 3000 metres steeplechase. The versatile Jamaican Wellesley Clayton took both the 110 metres hurdles and long jump gold medals. Jamaica completed a sweep of the women's titles and had three double champions: Carmen Smith (100 m and 80 metres hurdles), Una Morris (200 m and 400 m) and Joan Gordon (shot put and discus throw).

All the champions are known, but data is limited for the minor medallists.

Medal summary

Men

Women

References

Medallists
British West Indies Championships. GBR Athletics. Retrieved on 2015-03-21.

British West Indies Championships
British West Indies Championships
British West Indies Championships
British West Indies Championships
International athletics competitions hosted by Jamaica
Sport in Kingston, Jamaica